Rhodogastria similis is a moth in the family Erebidae. It was described by Heinrich Benno Möschler in 1884. It is found in South Africa and Zimbabwe.

The larvae feed on Pelargonium species and Prunus armeniaca.

References

Moths described in 1884
Spilosomina